Mustaf Haji Mohamed (died September 22, 2012) was a Somali member of the Federal Parliament of Somalia.

He was fatally shot on September 22, 2012 in Mogadishu.

References

Assassinated Somalian politicians
Year of birth missing
2012 deaths
Members of the Federal Parliament of Somalia